Wesendorf is a municipality in the district of Gifhorn, in Lower Saxony, Germany. It is situated approximately 12 km north of Gifhorn.

Wesendorf is also the seat of the Samtgemeinde Wesendorf ("collective municipality"). The municipality consists of the following villages:

 Wesendorf
 Westerholz

References

Gifhorn (district)